Elly Joenara (Perfected Spelling: Elly Yunara; 3 November 1923 – 30 May 1992) was an Indonesian film actress who later became a producer. She was the wife of producer Djamaluddin Malik.

Biography
Joenara was born in Straits Settlements (modern-day Singapore) on 3 November 1923. She completed an elementary education at a Hollandsch-Inlandsche School, a Dutch-run school for pribumi students, the Dutch East Indies.

Joenara made her film debut in Pah Wongso Pendekar Boediman, a 1940 detective film produced and directed by Jo Eng Sek of Star Film. In the film she played Siti, the romantic partner of a character portrayed by Mohamad Arief. She remained with the company for its further productions, including Tjioeng Wanara (from a Sundanese legend), Lintah Darat, and Ajah Berdosa. By 1942 she is recorded as acting in one film produced by Tan's Film under Tan Khoen Yauw, Aladin dengan Lampu Wasiat (Aladdin and the Magic Lamp).

The Japanese occupied the Indies in March 1942, closing all but one film studio in the colony. Production of Aladin dengan Lampu Wasiat stopped; the film would only be released in 1950, after the occupation and national revolution. During the occupation Yunara acted in theatre, going from troupe to troupe; she was part of the troupes Warnasari, Matahari, and Jawa Ehai. By 1949, when the Dutch recognised an independent Indonesia, Yunara had married stage manager turned film producer Djamaluddin Malik.

In 1950 Djamaluddin established a film company, Persari. Yunara completed two films for the company as an actress: Si Mientje in 1952 and Siapa Ajahku in 1954. However, her main role was managerial. Much of her time was spent as a housewife.

Djamaluddin died on 8 June 1970, leaving Yunara a widow. She soon established her own company, Remaja Ellyanda Film, and in 1972 began a career as a film producer with Malin Kundang. Directed by D. Djajakusuma and based on a Malay folk tale, the film starred Rano Karno and Putu Wijaya as the titular Malin Kundang, a young man who forgets his roots after spending much of his childhood at sea. This was followed by Jembatan Merah (1973), Petualang Cilik (1977), and Halimun (1979); the company also produced two non-feature films. In 1974 she received an award from Governor of Jakarta Ali Sadikin for her contributions to film.

Yunara died in Jakarta on 30 May 1992.

References

Works cited

Further reading

External links

1923 births
1992 deaths
People from Singapore
Indonesian film producers
Indonesian film actresses
Javanese people
Actresses of the Dutch East Indies
20th-century Indonesian actresses
Indonesian stage actresses
Singaporean emigrants to Indonesia
British Malaya emigrants to the Dutch East Indies